This is a list of butterflies of the United Arab Emirates. About 12 species are known from the United Arab Emirates.

Papilionidae

Papilioninae

Papilionini
Papilio machaon muetingi Seyer, 1976
Papilio demoleus Linnaeus, 1758

Pieridae

Pierinae

Pierini
Pieris rapae (Linnaeus, 1758)

Lycaenidae

Lycaeninae
Lycaena phlaeas shima Gabriel, 1954

Polyommatinae

Lycaenesthini
Anthene amarah (Guérin-Méneville, 1849)

Polyommatini
Tarucus balkanicus (Freyer, 1843)
Zizeeria karsandra (Moore, 1865)
Brephidium exilis (Boisduval, 1852)
Chilades parrhasius (Fabricius, 1793)

Nymphalidae

Satyrinae

Satyrini
Ypthima asterope (Klug, 1832)
Hipparchia parisatis (Kollar, 1849)

Nymphalinae

Nymphalini
Hypolimnas misippus (Linnaeus, 1764)

See also
List of moths of the United Arab Emirates
Wildlife of the United Arab Emirates

References

Lists of butterflies by location
Butterflies
Butterflies by country
U

Butterflies